John E. Kenna  is a 1901 marble sculpture of the American politician of the same name by Alexander Doyle, installed in the United States Capitol, in Washington, D.C., as part of the National Statuary Hall Collection. It is one of two statues donated by the state of West Virginia.

See also
 1901 in art

References

External links
 

1901 establishments in Washington, D.C.
1901 sculptures
Marble sculptures in Washington, D.C.
Confederate States of America monuments and memorials in Washington, D.C.
Kenna, John
Sculptures of men in Washington, D.C.